The 2013 Ulster Senior Club Football Championship was the 46th instalment of the annual competition organised by Ulster GAA. It was one of the four provincial competitions of the 2013–14 All-Ireland Senior Club Football Championship.

Crossmaglen Rangers of Armagh were the defending champions, having defeated Kilcoo of Down in the 2012 final. Kilcoo would end their reign as champions at the quarter-final stage.

Derry's Ballinderry Shamrocks were crowned Ulster champions for the third time after defeating Donegal champions Glenswilly in the final.

Teams
The Ulster championship is contested by the winners of the nine county championships in the Irish province of Ulster. Ulster comprises the six counties of Northern Ireland, as well as Cavan, Donegal and Monaghan in the Republic of Ireland.

Bracket

Preliminary round

Quarter-finals

Semi-finals

Final

Championship statistics

Top scorers
Overall

In a single game

References

External links
 Ulster GAA website
 Ulster club quarter-final photos

Ulster Senior Club Football Championship
Gaelic
Ulster Senior Club Football Championship